WASP-17 is an F-type main sequence star approximately 1,300 light-years away in the constellation Scorpius.  

WASP-17 is named Dìwö. The name was selected in the NameExoWorlds campaign by Costa Rica, during the 100th anniversary of the IAU. Dìwö in Bribri language means the sun.

The star, although similar to Sun in terms of overall contents of heavy elements, is depleted of carbon. Carbon to oxygen molar ratio of 0.18 for WASP-17 is well below solar ratio of 0.55.

Planetary system

As of 2009, an extrasolar planet has been confirmed to orbit the star. The star is unusual in that it has an orbiting exoplanet, WASP-17b, which is believed to orbit in the opposite direction to the star's spin and is said to be twice the size of Jupiter, but half its mass. It is subject to intensive photo-evaporation, and may be completely destroyed within one billion years from now.

The planet was discovered by the SuperWASP project, hence the name.

References

Scorpius (constellation)
F-type main-sequence stars
Planetary systems with one confirmed planet
Planetary transit variables
J15595095-2803422
17